Franz Joseph I of Austria (1830–1916) was Emperor of Austria, Apostolic King of Hungary and King of Bohemia.

Franz Josef or Franz Joseph may also refer to:

People known solely by the name 
 Franz Joseph I, Prince of Liechtenstein (1726–1781), Knight of the Golden Fleece
 Franz Joseph II, Prince of Liechtenstein (1906–1989), Knight of the Golden Fleece
 Franz Joseph, Prince of Hohenzollern-Emden (1891–1964), Nazi party member and SS officer
 Franz Joseph, 9th Prince of Thurn and Taxis (1893–1971)
 Franz Joseph, 5th Prince of Hohenlohe-Schillingsfürst (1787–1841)
 Franz Joseph, Prince of Dietrichstein (1767–1854)
 Franz Joseph, Count Kinsky (1739–1805)
 Franz Joseph, Marquis de Lusignan (1753–1832)
 Franz Joseph (artist) (1914–1994), artist and author loosely associated with Star Trek

People with the given name 
 Franz Joseph Antony (1790–1837), choral composer
 Franz Joseph Emil Fischer (1877–1947), German chemist
 Franz Joseph Feuchtmayer (1660–1718), sculptor and stuccoist
 Franz Joseph Gall (1758–1828), neuroanatomist and physiologist
 Franz Joseph Haydn (1732–1809), composer 
 Franz Joseph Molitor (1779–1860), German writer and philosopher
 Franz-Joseph Müller von Reichenstein (1740–1825), Hungarian mineralogist
 Franz Josef Strauß (1915–1988), German politician
 Eligius Franz Joseph von Münch-Bellinghausen (1806-1871), Austrian dramatist, poet and short-story writer
 Franz Joseph Otto von Habsburg (1912–2011), the last Crown Prince of Austria-Hungary
 Franz-Josef Wuermeling (1900-1986), West German politician and government minister

Places 
 Franz Josef, New Zealand, a town in the South Island of New Zealand
 Franz Josef Glacier, in the South Island of New Zealand
 Franz Josef Land, an archipelago in the Arctic Ocean, in the far north of Russia

Ships
 , Austro-Hungarian Navy's Kaiser Franz Joseph I-class cruiser
 , passenger liner ship

See also
 Joseph Franz (disambiguation)
 Francis Joseph (disambiguation)